Colonel  Muhammad Khan (1910 – 23 October 1999) was a Pakistan Army officer and a war veteran. He also served in the Indian Army of the undivided British India and was a veteran of World War II. While serving in Pakistan Army, he wrote his first book Bajung Aamad which was a humorous autobiography. This book became extremely popular and became one of the most famous books in Urdu literature. The success of his first book earned him critically acclaimed prominence among Urdu humorists and he is considered one of the most influential authors of this genre. He was the fellow of Mushtaq Ahmad Yusufi, Zamir Jafri, Shafiq-ur-Rahman.

He is mostly known as Colonel Muhammad Khan to distinguish him from other bearers of this common name, despite his efforts to be recognised by his birth name. Later editions of his books show his name as just Muhammad Khan.

Biography
He was born as Muhammad Khan in the village of Balkasar which is a part of the city of Chakwal. He studied in Islamia College, Lahore and when World War II broke out, he joined the British Indian Army. He served in Iraq, Egypt, Palestine and in the Western Desert during the Second World War, where he valorously fought against the Germans.

He rose to fame when he surprised the literary circles through his book Bajung Aamad. It was an autobiographical account of his life as a soldier in World War II. In 1974, he went on a tour of the UK and later published his account of the UK tour in Basalamat Ravi. Later he published another book, Bazam Arayan, a collection of semi autobiographical short stories.

Books
Bajang Aamad
Basalamat Ravi
Bazam Araiyan
Badesi Mazah
Tasneefat-e-Kernal Muhammad Khan

References

Indian Army personnel of World War II
Pakistan Army officers
People from Chakwal District
1910 births
1999 deaths
Pakistani military writers
British Indian Army officers